The Easter Journey is the fourth album recorded by Philippine-based vocal ensemble Hangad. The album contains all-original songs intended to be performed for the Easter liturgy in the Roman Catholic Church. It also includes an almost complete set of songs for the Holy Mass, the Lord, Have Mercy prayer having been omitted.
 
Easter Journey was launched in cassettes and CDs on February 27, 2005, at the Church of Gesu in Ateneo de Manila University, Quezon City.

Track listing 

All words, music, and arrangements (instrumental and choral) provided by Paulo K. Tirol except where noted
 The Easter Journey
 Children Of Light And Of The Morning
 words based on the Eucharistic Prayer of the Holy Mass for the Easter liturgy; orchestral arrangement by Dennis Reyes, III
 Awit Ng Paghilom (new) (Tagalog. Song of Healing)
 Words and music by Arnel Aquino, SJ; arranged by P. Tirol
 Glory To God
 based on the text from the Roman Missal
 Psalm 33 ("The earth is full of the goodness of the Lord")
 Without Seeing You
 Words and music by David Haas; arranged by JC Uy
 Gospel Acclamation & Alleluia
 based on the text from the Roman Missal
 Pieta (Oyayi Sa Paanan Ni Hesus) (Tag. Pieta (Lullabye at the Feet of Jesus' Cross)
 Words by Michelle Joy Francia; cello arrangement by Jay Gomez
 won an Awit Award in 2006 for Best Inspirational or Religious Song
 Presentation Of The Gifts
 based on the text from the Roman Missal; additional lyrics by P. Tirol
 Love Untold
 Holy
 based on the text from the Roman Missal
 Memorial Acclamation
 based on the text from the Roman Missal
 Doxology & Great Amen
 based on the text from the Roman Missal
 The Lord's Prayer
 Acclamation To The Lord's Prayer
 Lamb Of God
 based on the text from the Roman Missal
 Here In This Place
 words and music by D. Haas; arranged by JC Uy
 Out Of The Night
 Words and music by Nicky Reyes; additional lyrics by Julius Guevarra
 Jagged Pieces
 Arranged by J. Guevarra
 Recessional Hymn (Go and tell every nation)
 Praise Be To God
 adapted from Psalms 148 and 150
 Send Your Spirit
 choral arrangement by JC Uy; strings arrangement by Dennis Reyes III
 Queen Of Heaven, Rejoice
 based on the Regina coeli responsory

Credits 
Instrumentalists
 Piano - Paulo Tirol
 Flute - Jay Gomez
 Violins - Bernadette Cadorniga, Catherine Magallon, Antonio Bautista, Corrina Lapena
 Viola - Antonio Bautista, Francisco Llorin
 Cello - Eduardo Pasamba, Francisco Llorin
 Double Bass - Delfin Calderon
 Trumpet - Raymund de Leon
 Trombone -Sumin Kim
 French Horns - Melvin Rioveros, Dondon Lucena
 Acoustic Guitar - Toto Sorioso, Nobel Queano, Francisco Buencamino, Criss Buenviaje
 Electric Guitar - Dolf Cruz
 Electric Bass - Joon Guillen
 Drums - Jazz Nicolas
 Percussions - Carla Pido

Production
 Executive producer - JBoy Gonzales
 Project manager - Julius Guevarra
 Musical direction - Paulo Tirol and JC Uy
 Coordinator - Lissa Fontanilla
 Production team - Mariel de Jesus, Elaine Aliga, TJ San Jose, Chrise Cortez, Nicky Reyes, Trin Panganiban, Monchu Lucero

Engineering
 Mixing and Mastering Engineer - Robbie Grande
 Recording Engineers - Willan Caimol, Jay Gomez, Toto Sorioso

Art
 Album design coordinator - Louis Ricohermoso
 Photography - Dave Fabros
 Pictorial art direction - Bryan Atienza
 Inlay design and illustration, album art direction - Mad Banana: A Motion and Design Company

Songbook
 Production manager - TJ San Jose
 Editors - JC Uy, Pulo Tirol, Julius Guevarra
 Encoders - Rose VBina, Julius Guevarra, Louis Ricohermoso, Clare Royandoyan, Toby Sandoval, Bea Siojo, Nicky Reyes
 Copywriters - Trin Panganiban-Custodio, Mariel de Jesus, MJ Francia, Paulo Tirol
 Design coordinator - Louis Rocohermoso
 Design and illustration, art direction - Mad Banana: A Motion and Design Company

Award 
Pieta (Oyayi sa Paanan ni Hesus) won an Awit Award for Best Inspiration or Religious Song for Hangad, besting other songs recorded by more popular artists like Gary Valenciano (who was thrice nominated in the same category) and Christian Bautista.

Trivia 
 , The Easter Journey and A Wish for Christmas are the only albums by Hangad that do not contain the word "hangad" in the title.
 Awit ng Paghilom is a remake of the same song found in the Hangad debut album.
 Psalm 33 was originally composed for the wedding of Hangad members Leanne Laudico and Chad Arcinue, who performed the group's first single Pananatili (from the debut album).
 Pieta (Oyayi sa Paanan ni Hesus) and Awit ng Paghilom are the only Tagalog songs written in this album.

External links 
 The Easter Journey – information about the album, including audio samples and lyrics.
 Awit Awards - page showing Hangad's award for Pieta
 List of nominees for the Awit Awards 2006

Hangad albums
2005 albums